Blood and High Heels is a 2012 Hungarian short film, directed and written by Dávid Géczy. It's official selected at Cannes Film Festival Short Film Corner. The film was also included in the France and Los Angeles Film Market list. It stars Iván Kamarás and Sonia Couling.

Plot 
The film is about workplace sexual harassment, the worse relationship between one feminist secretary & one chauvinistic boss in the current world economic crisis.

Rose Red (Sonia Couling) got a new job as a secretary during the economic crisis and a new boss Ivan Milkov (Iván Kamarás), who thinks "the world in crises, caused by women".

Cast 

 Sonia Couling - Rose Red
 Iván Kamarás - Ivan Milkov
 Alexis Latham - director

Music 

 The Same Wind Blows - Marton Vojnits

References

External links 

 
 
 Blood and High Heels – Making of
 
 Europa Design Hungary (Vér és tűsarok gallery) 
 A film fanpage
 Blood and High Heels - trailer

Hungarian short films
2010s business films
2012 short films
2012 films
2010s English-language films